Trauma is a ITV television drama series that was first broadcast on 12 February 2018. Created and written by Mike Bartlett,  the series is about a father grappling with losing his son and blaming the trauma consultant.

Cast
Adrian Lester as Jon Allerton
John Simm as Dan Bowker
Lyndsey Marshal as Susie Bowker
Jemima Rooper as Nora Barker
Jade Anouka as Alana Allerton
Albie Marber as Alex Bowker
Rowena King as Lisa Allerton
Raffiella Chapman as Catherine Bowker
James Gasson as Mark Bowker

Episode list

Reception
Rotten Tomatoes reports an approval rating of 100% based on 10 reviews, with an average rating of 6.8/10. The site's critics' consensus reads: 'What Trauma lacks in originality it more than makes up for in gripping performances from well-matched leads Adrian Lester and John Simm.'
The Guardian found the first episode intriguing and praised the execution. The Times gave it four out five stars.

References

External links
 

2018 British television series debuts
2018 British television series endings
2010s British drama television series
English-language television shows
Television shows set in England